The Cinema of Chad is small though growing. The first film made in the country appears to have been 1958 John Huston adventure film The Roots of Heaven, filmed when the country was still a part of French Equatorial Africa. Documentary filmmaker Edouard Sailly made a series of shorts in the 1960s depicting daily life in the country. During this period there were a number of cinemas in the country, including in N'Djamena Le Normandie, Le Vogue, the Rio, the Étoile and the Shéherazade, and also the Rex in Sarh, the Logone in Moundou and the Ciné Chachati in Abéché. The film industry suffered severely in the 1970s-80s as Chad became engulfed in a series of civil wars and foreign military interventions; film production stopped, and all the cinemas in Chad closed down. Following the ousting of dictator Hissène Habré by Idriss Déby in 1990 the situation in the country stabilised somewhat, allowing the development of a nascent film industry, most notably with the work of directors Mahamat-Saleh Haroun, Issa Serge Coelo and Abakar Chene Massar. Mahamat-Saleh Haroun has won awards at the Panafrican Film and Television Festival of Ouagadougou, Venice International Film Festival and the Cannes Film Festival. In January 2011 Le Normandie in N'Djamena, said to now be the only cinema in Chad, re-opened with government support.

List of Chadian films

The following is a sortable list of films produced or shot in Chad.

See also

Culture of Chad
List of African films

External links
 Chadian film  at the Internet Movie Database

References

 
film
 
Chad